Four-time defending champion Shingo Kunieda and his partner Maikel Scheffers defeated the other defending champion Stéphane Houdet and his partner Nicolas Peifer in the final, 6–3, 6–3 to win the men's doubles wheelchair tennis title at the 2011 Australian Open.

Seeds
  Maikel Scheffers /  Shingo Kunieda (champions)
  Stéphane Houdet /  Nicolas Peifer (final)

Draw

Finals

External links
 Main Draw

Wheelchair Men's Doubles
2011 Men's Doubles